High Court of Lagos State is the highest state court of law in Lagos State. It has several divisions, including Igbosere,  Lagos Island, Ikeja,Epe, Ajah, Badagry and Ikorodu divisions.

References

External links
 Lagos State Judiciary
Lagos State Judiciary (recent)

Lagos State courts
Lagos State law
Judiciary of Lagos State
Courts and tribunals with year of establishment missing